William Gosling may refer to:

 William Gosling (engineer) (born ca. 1930), British electrical engineer
 William Gosling (VC) (1892–1945), English recipient of the Victoria Cross
 William Gilbert Gosling (1863–1930), Canadian politician, businessman and author
 William Gosling (footballer) (1869–1952), British football player
 William W. Gosling (1824–1883), Victorian landscape painter.